In the Tour de France, one of the three Grand Tours of professional stage cycling, the yellow jersey is given to the leader of the general classification. The Tour de France is the most famous road cycling event in the world, and is held annually in the month of July. Although all riders compete together, the winners of the Tour are divided into classifications, each best known by the coloured jersey that is worn by the leader of it; the general classification (GC), represented by the maillot jaune (yellow jersey), is for the overall leader in terms of the lowest time. The other individual classifications in the Tour de France are the points classification, also known as the sprinters' classification (green jersey), the mountains classification (polka dot jersey), and the young rider classification (white jersey).

The first Tour de France was in 1903, but the yellow jersey was only introduced during the 1919 Tour de France, during which Firmin Lambot was the first Belgian cyclist ever to wear the yellow jersey.

List
"Obtained" refers to the date and stage where the rider secured the lead of the general classification at the finish; the rider would first wear the yellow jersey in the stage after, where he would start the day as leader. "Relinquished" refers to the date and stage where the rider lost the lead, and therefore was not wearing the yellow jersey the following stage.

Notes

See also
List of Australian cyclists who have led the Tour de France general classification
List of British cyclists who have led the Tour de France general classification
List of Dutch cyclists who have led the Tour de France general classification
Yellow jersey statistics

References

External links

Lists of cyclists
Tour de France-related lists
Cycle racing in Belgium
Tour de France people